Stigmella ogygia is a moth of the family Nepticulidae. It is found in New Zealand.

The length of the forewings is about 3 mm. Adults have been recorded in March, July and from September to December. Reared specimens hatched in January, April, May and August. There are probably continuous generations throughout the year.

The larvae feed mainly on Senecio species, like Senecio biserratus and Senecio minimus. They mine the leaves of their host plant. The mine is narrow, serpentine and close to the upper epidermal layer, widening terminally. The frass is deposited medially. Larva have been recorded from April to September and in November and December. They are 3–4 mm long and pale green.

The cocoon is made of brown silk and is located against the stem of the food plant.

References

External links
Fauna of New Zealand - Number 16: Nepticulidae (Insecta: Lepidoptera)

Nepticulidae
Moths of New Zealand
Endemic fauna of New Zealand
Moths described in 1889
Endemic moths of New Zealand